Goldsmith Whitehouse Hewitt (February 14, 1834 – May 27, 1895) was a U.S. Representative from Alabama.

Biography
Born near Elyton (now Birmingham), Jefferson County, Alabama, Hewitt attended the country schools. Entered the Confederate States Army in June 1861 as a private in Company B, 10th Regiment Alabama Infantry. Promoted to captain of Company G, Twenty-eighth Regiment, Alabama Infantry, in 1862. Graduated from Cumberland School of Law at Cumberland University, Lebanon, Tennessee, in 1866. Admitted to the bar the same year and commenced practice in Birmingham, Alabama.

Hewitt served as member of the State house of representatives in 1870 and 1871, and as a member of the State senate from 1872 to 1874, resigning in the latter year.  Elected as a Democrat to the Forty-fourth and Forty-fifth Congresses (March 4, 1875 – March 3, 1879). Elected to the Forty-seventh and Forty-eighth Congresses (March 4, 1881 – March 3, 1885). Served as chairman of the Committee on Pensions (Forty-eighth Congress). He was not a candidate for renomination in 1884.

Hewitt resumed the practice of law and again served as member of the State house of representatives in 1886–1888. He died in Birmingham, Alabama, on May 27, 1895 and was interred in Oak Hill Cemetery.

Notes

References
 Retrieved on 2009-5-12

External links
 Goldsmith Hewitt II bhamwiki.com

1834 births
1895 deaths
Democratic Party Alabama state senators
Democratic Party members of the Alabama House of Representatives
Alabama lawyers
Confederate States Army officers
Democratic Party members of the United States House of Representatives from Alabama
19th-century American politicians
19th-century American lawyers